Chauncey Antoine Davis (born January 27, 1983 in Bartow, Florida) is a former American football defensive end. He was originally drafted by the Atlanta Falcons in the fourth round of the 2005 NFL Draft. He played college football at Florida State.

He also played for the Chicago Bears.

Early years
Davis was born in Bartow, Florida, but raised in Auburndale by Glenda Davis. According to a DNA analysis, his ancestries are, mainly, Temne and Mende people of Sierra Leone. He was First-team All-State Class 4A and All-America selection as a senior at Auburndale  High School, rushing for 1,000 yards in addition to playing linebacker and defensive end.

College career 
Davis totaled 40 tackles, seven sacks, two forced fumbles, one fumble recovery, and one blocked kick in 24 games for Florida State. Converted to defensive end as a senior from the outside linebacker position.  He was named the team’s most improved defensive end and outstanding player as a senior after posting 22 tackles, five sacks, one forced fumble and one fumble recovery in 11 starts.
He also attended Jones County Junior College.

Professional career

Atlanta Falcons
Davis was selected in the fourth round of the 2005 NFL Draft by the Atlanta Falcons. After spending six seasons with the team, he was released on September 2, 2011.

Chicago Bears
The Chicago Bears signed Davis on November 14, 2011. He was waived by the team on August 31, 2012.

References

External links
 Florida State Seminoles bio

1983 births
Living people
American people of Sierra Leonean descent
Sportspeople of Sierra Leonean descent
Players of American football from Florida
American football defensive ends
Jones County Bobcats football players
Florida State Seminoles football players
Atlanta Falcons players
Chicago Bears players